An audio optical disc is an optical disc that stores sound information such as music or speech.

It may specifically refer to:

Audio CDs
 Compact disc (CD), an optical disc used to store digital data (700 MB storage)
 Compact Disc Digital Audio (CD-DA), a CD that contains PCM encoded digital audio in the original "Red Book" CD-DA format
 5.1 Music Disc, an extension to the Red Book standard that uses DTS Coherent Acoustics 5.1 surround sound
 Compressed audio optical disc, an optical disc storing MP3s and other compressed audio files as data, rather than in the Red Book format

Audio DVDs

DVD, 4 GB single layer, 8 GB double layer storage
 DVD-Audio, a DVD that plays audio
 Super Audio CD (SACD), a format which competes with DVD-Audio

Audio Blu-rays

Blu-ray, 25 GB single layer, 50 GB double layer
 BD-Audio, a Blu-ray disc that is capable of audio-only playback

See also
CD-4 or Compatible discrete four-channel sound, a variety of quadrophonic audio for vinyl records